Asia Barak or Asiabarak may refer to:
 Asia Barak, Rudbar
 Asiabarak, Siahkal